Omar Musaj (born 15 April 2002) is an Albanian professional footballer who plays as a left-back for Turbina, on loan from Tirana.

Career
A youth academy graduate of Tirana, Musaj made his professional debut on 4 November 2020 in a 2–0 league win against Kukësi.

Musaj is a current Albanian youth international.

Career statistics

Club

TROPHIES 
Erzeni; 2021–22 (Runner-up)

References

External links
 

2002 births
Living people
People from Tirana County
Footballers from Tirana
Albanian footballers
Association football defenders
Kategoria Superiore players
KF Tirana players